The Women's Euro Winners Cup (WEWC) is an annual continental beach soccer club competition contested between top-division European women's teams; the clubs that are their country's national league/cup champions (and, for some nations, one or more runners-up) from countries all across Europe take part. Organised by Beach Soccer Worldwide (BSWW), the championship is viewed as the sport's version of the UEFA Women's Champions League in association football.

Offering the strongest level of club competition in Europe, it is the most prestigious women's club beach soccer championship in Europe; the winners become continental champions. The first edition took place in 2016, following the founding of the men's edition three years prior. It takes place within the framework of the larger men's version of the tournament, happening during the same dates and location over the course of about a week.

Of the seven editions to date, each has been won by a different club; Spain have produced the most winning sides (three).

Organisation
As of 2022

Founding

Beach Soccer Worldwide (BSWW) publicly announced the creation of the championship in December 2015, coming off the back of the multiple successful stagings of the men's edition since 2013. They cited the many women's national leagues/cups in Europe and their "strongest commitment" to begin ramping up the development of women's beach soccer as the reasons for its creation.

Qualification
From each European nation, the champions of their highest level of women's beach soccer competition (be it a national league or knockout cup) qualify for the event.

In countries where women's clubs exist but a national women's league/cup does not yet take place, clubs can contact BSWW to register themselves as that country's representative.

If a national association wishes to enter additional clubs who are not an incumbent league champion, they can request for permission to do so from the organisers BSWW who will grant or reject the clubs a berth at the tournament depending on the total number of teams already registered.

In 2020 and 2021, qualification was completely abandoned due to health concerns and travel constraints caused by the COVID-19 pandemic meaning many clubs could not compete. The competition was opened up to simply any club in Europe that was able and willing to participate; the competition format was also altered accordingly for these editions.

Format
The tournament starts with the group stage. The clubs are split into groups (typically of four) and compete in a round robin format. At the end of the group stage, the top 16 clubs advance to the knockout stage. The teams then compete in single-elimination matches; the round of 16, quarter-finals, semi-finals and ending with the final. Consolation matches are also played to determine the final rankings involving the clubs knocked out of these rounds.

Results

A.  San Javier won the penalty shootout 2–0.
B.  Bonaire Terrassa won the penalty shootout 6–5.
Round robin.  Indicates this edition was played as a round-robin tournament. There was no final or third place match.

Performance

Successful clubs

Successful nations

Awards

Appearances & performance timeline
The following is an appearance and performance timeline of the countries who have been represented by clubs at the Women's Euro Winners Cup. It shows which countries were represented at each edition and by how many clubs. The colour of the cells indicates the furthest any of that country's clubs progressed in the competition in that edition, corresponding to the key below.

18 members of UEFA have been represented by at least one club in at least one edition to date.

Key

a. Not used in 2020–21.
b. Not used in 2016–17, 20–22.

Timeline

See also
Euro Winners Cup (men's edition)

References

External links
 Beach Soccer Worldwide, official website
 Euro Winners Cup, at Beach Soccer Russia (in Russian)

 
Beach soccer competitions
Women's association football competitions in Europe
2016 establishments in Europe
Recurring sporting events established in 2016
Multi-national professional sports leagues